Edna Turnblad is a character from the following four media:

Hairspray (1988 film), played by Divine
Hairspray (musical), played on Broadway by Harvey Fierstein
Hairspray (2007 film), played by John Travolta
Hairspray Live!, played, on live television in December 2016, by Harvey Fierstein